Kışlacık can refer to:

 Kışlacık, Çubuk
 Kışlacık, Kemaliye
 Kışlacık, Mecitözü